D-Day Remembered is a 1994 American documentary film directed by Charles Guggenheim for The National WWII Museum. It aired as an episode of the PBS series American Experience. It was nominated for an Academy Award for Best Documentary Feature.

References

External links

D-Day Remembered at Direct Cinema Limited
D-Day at American Experience

1994 films
1994 documentary films
American Experience
American documentary films
American black-and-white films
American World War II films
Films directed by Charles Guggenheim
Operation Overlord films
1990s English-language films
1990s American films